The 1936 United States presidential election in Delaware was held on November 3, 1936. The state voters chose three electors to the Electoral College, who voted for president and vice president.

Delaware voted for Democratic Party candidate and incumbent President Franklin D. Roosevelt, who defeated Republican nominee, Kansas Governor Alf Landon. Roosevelt won the state by a margin of 9.77%.

While Landon lost the state, the 44.85% of the popular vote made Delaware his fifth strongest state in the 1936 election in terms of popular vote percentage after Vermont, Maine, New Hampshire and Kansas.

This election marked Delaware's transition into a bellwether state: for the rest of the 20th century, it would vote for a losing candidate only once (in 1948). Once the century rolled around, it came to be regarded as a solidly blue state.

Results

See also
 United States presidential elections in Delaware

References

Delaware
1936
1936 Delaware elections